Khandala is a rural locality (an ulus) in Kabansky District, Republic of Buryatia, Russia. The population was 287 as of 2010. There are 6 streets.

Geography 
Khandala is located 35 km northeast of Kabansk (the district's administrative centre) by road. Shergino is the nearest rural locality.

References 

Rural localities in Kabansky District